Pictodentalium is a genus of molluscs belonging to the family Dentaliidae.

Species
 Pictodentalium festivum (G. B. Sowerby III, 1914)
 Pictodentalium formosum (A. Adams & Reeve, 1850)
 Pictodentalium vernedei (Hanley in G. B. Sowerby II, 1860)

References

 Habe, T. (1963). A classification of the scaphopod mollusks found in Japan and adjacent areas. Bulletin of the National Science Museum Tokyo. 6(3): 252–281, pls 37–38.

External links
 Steiner, G.; Kabat, A. R. (2001). Catalogue of supraspecific taxa of Scaphopoda (Mollusca). Zoosystema. 23(3): 433-460

Dentaliidae